A heptadecahedron (or heptakaidecahedron) is a polyhedron with 17 faces. No heptadecahedron is regular; hence, the name is ambiguous. There are numerous topologically distinct forms of a heptadecahedron, for example the hexadecagonal pyramid and pentadecagonal prism.

Convex

There are 6,415,851,530,241 topologically distinct convex heptadecahedra, excluding mirror images, having at least 11 vertices. (Two polyhedra are "topologically distinct" if they have intrinsically different arrangements of faces and vertices, such that it is impossible to distort one into the other simply by changing the lengths of edges or the angles between edges or faces.)

The infinite Laves graph has convex heptadecahedral Voronoi cells. Because of the symmetries of the graph, these heptadecahedra are plesiohedra form an isohedral tessellation of three-dimensional space.

References

What Are Polyhedra?, with Greek Numerical Prefixes

External links

Polyhedra